Last Chants for a Slow Dance is a 1977 American drama film directed by Jon Jost and starring Tom Blair.

Plot
This film follows a misanthropic working-class husband and father (Tom Blair) struggling to find work in the Midwestern United States. As the film progresses, it seems that he has little actual interest in supporting his family, as he spends his time hanging out in bars and having one-night stands. He continues to drive from town to town until, in an act of desperation, he robs and murders another man.

Cast
 Tom Blair
 Wayne Crouse
 Jessica St. John
 Steve Voorheis

References

External links

1977 films
1977 drama films
American drama films
American independent films
Films directed by Jon Jost
1970s English-language films
1970s American films